Bruce Alexander McPhee (11 February 1927 – 22 September 2009) was an Australian motor racing driver. He is most famous for winning the 1968 Hardie-Ferodo 500 (now the Bathurst 1000), defeating both the Holden and Ford factory teams.

Career

At the 1968 Hardie-Ferodo 500, McPhee drove a Holden Monaro GTS327 painted yellow with black stripes with the number 13. His co-driver, who drove just one lap that day, was Barry Mulholland. McPhee would later claim in Australian Muscle Car magazine that an attempt to sabotage his Monaro was made the night before the race. As the race cars were road registered in that era, McPhee had driven the car back to his motel in Bathurst for the night. When he came out on race morning to fill the car with petrol, a number of tree leaves floated to the top of the filler. Luckily this was found before any potential damage could have put the car out of the race. The Monaro, supplied and sponsored by Wyong Motors, ran the race on one set of used, almost bald tyres, McPhee believing that they were faster than tyres with full tread (race regulations at the time stated the cars had to race on road tyres). Towards the end of the race track marshals around the Mount Panorama Circuit were reporting seeing sparks from the Monaro's Michelin tyres as they had worn down to their steel belts after almost 500 miles (800 km) of racing.

McPhee entered the 1969 Hardie-Ferodo 500 originally intending to run one of the new HT Monaro GTS350's, but when he received no help from Holden to do so he instead drove a privately entered XW Ford Falcon GTHO. Driving with Mulholland who again only drove one lap, the McPhee Falcon finished a close second at Bathurst to the Colin Bond/Tony Roberts HDT Monaro GTS350. Many, including HDT boss Harry Firth, believe that if not for an early pit stop to change a tyre after a clash with another car resulting in a late stop for fuel as they were out of sequence, McPhee and Mulholland would have won in '69 and made it back to back Bathurst 500's.

McPhee joined the Ford works team in 1970, driving in the South Pacific Touring Series early in the year, and was given his own Phase II XW GTHO to drive solo at the 1970 Hardie-Ferodo 500. Even though his car was still running near perfectly at the end of the 500 miles, McPhee finished second after following team orders not to pass his teammate, lead driver Allan Moffat.

As well as the 1968 outright win in the Holden Monaro, McPhee finished on the podium at Bathurst in 1963 (3rd) in a Ford Cortina Mk.I GT (the first year the race was run at Mount Panorama), 1965 (2nd) in a Ford Cortina Mk.I GT500, 1966 (3rd) in a Morris Cooper S, 1969 (2nd) in a XW Ford Falcon GTHO Phase I and 1970 (2nd) in a XW Ford Falcon GTHO Phase II.

McPhee also claimed the 1968 Hardie-Ferodo 500 pole position giving him the dual honour of being the first "Bathurst 500" race winner for Holden and the first "Bathurst 500" pole position winner for Holden.

Personal life
McPhee lived the majority of his life on the NSW Central Coast until his death on 22 September 2009 at the age of 82.

Career results

Complete Bathurst 500/1000 results

Further reading
 Barry Lake, Solitary Man, Bruce McPhee 1927–2009, Motor Racing Australia, Dec/Jan 2009–2010

1927 births
2009 deaths
Bathurst 1000 winners
People from the Central Coast (New South Wales)
Racing drivers from New South Wales